The Great Northern Railway  was an American Class I railroad. Running from Saint Paul, Minnesota, to Seattle, Washington, it was the creation of 19th-century railroad entrepreneur James J. Hill and was developed from the Saint Paul & Pacific Railroad. The Great Northern's route was the northernmost transcontinental railroad route in the U.S.

In 1970, the Great Northern Railway merged with three other railroads to form the Burlington Northern Railroad, which merged in 1996 with the Atchison, Topeka and Santa Fe Railway to form the Burlington Northern and Santa Fe Railway.

History
The Great Northern was built in stages, slowly creating profitable lines, before extending the road further into undeveloped Western territories.  In a series of the earliest public relations campaigns, contests were held to promote interest in the railroad and the ranchlands along its route. Fred J. Adams used promotional incentives such as feed and seed donations to farmers getting started along the line.  Contests were all-inclusive, from the largest farm animals to the largest freight carload capacity, and were promoted heavily to immigrants and newcomers from the East.

The very first predecessor railroad to the company was the St. Paul and Pacific Railroad owned by William Crooks.  He had gone bankrupt running a small line between St. Paul and Minneapolis.  He named the locomotive he ran for himself and the William Crooks would be the first locomotive of the Great Northern Railway.  J.J. Hill convinced New York banker John S. Kennedy, Norman Kittson (a wealthy fur trader friend), Donald Smith (a Hudson's Bay Company executive), George Stephen (Smith's cousin and president of the Bank of Montreal), and others to invest $5.5 million in purchasing the railroad. On March 13, 1878, the road's creditors formally signed an agreement transferring their bonds and control of the railroad to  J.J. Hill's investment group. On September 18, 1889, Hill changed the name of the Minneapolis and St. Cloud Railway (a railroad which existed primarily on paper, but which held very extensive land grants throughout the Midwest and Pacific Northwest) to the Great Northern Railway. On February 1, 1890, he consolidated his ownership of the StPM&M, Montana Central Railway, and other rail lines to the Great Northern.

The Great Northern had branches that ran north to the Canada–US border in Minnesota, North Dakota, and Montana. It also had branches that ran to Superior, Wisconsin, and Butte, Montana, connecting with the iron range of Minnesota and copper mines of Montana.  In 1898 Hill purchased control of large parts of the   Messabe Iron Range in Minnesota and its rail lines. The Great Northern began large-scale shipment of ore to the steel mills of the Midwest.

The railroad's best-known engineer was John Frank Stevens, who served from 1889 to 1903. Stevens was acclaimed for his 1889 exploration of Marias Pass in Montana and determined its practicability for a railroad. Stevens was an efficient administrator with remarkable technical skills and imagination. He discovered Stevens Pass through the Cascade Mountains, set railroad construction standards in the Mesabi Range, and supervised the construction of the Oregon Trunk Line. He then became the chief engineer of the Panama Canal.

The logo of the railroad, a Rocky Mountain goat, was based on a goat William Kenney, one of the railroad's presidents, had used to haul newspapers as a boy.

Mainline

The mainline began at Saint Paul, Minnesota, heading west along the Mississippi River bluffs, crossing the river to Minneapolis on a massive multi-piered stone arch bridge just below the Saint Anthony Falls. The bridge ceased to be used as a railroad bridge in 1978 and is now used as a pedestrian river crossing with excellent views of the falls and of the lock system. The mainline headed northwest from the Twin Cities, across North Dakota and eastern Montana. The line then crossed the Rocky Mountains at Marias Pass. It then followed the Flathead River and then Kootenai River to Bonners Ferry, Idaho, south to Sandpoint, Idaho, west to Newport, Washington, and then to Spokane, Washington. The company town and extensive railroad facility of Hillyard, Washington was named after James J. Hill and briefly manufactured the R Class 2-8-8-2 around 1927 which was the largest steam locomotive in the world at the time. From there the mainline crossed the Cascade Mountains through the Cascade Tunnel under Stevens Pass, reaching Seattle, Washington, in 1893, with the driving of the last spike at Scenic, Washington, on January 6, 1893. The Great Northern electrified Steven's Pass and briefly owned the electric Spokane and Inland Empire Railway. The deadliest avalanche in US history swept two Great Northern trains off the tracks at Wellington, Wa. by the Cascade Tunnel killing 96 people.

The mainline west of Marias Pass has been relocated twice. The original route over Haskell Pass, via Kalispell and Marion, Montana, was replaced in 1904 by a more circuitous but flatter route via Whitefish and Eureka, joining the Kootenai River at Rexford, Montana. A further reroute was necessitated by the construction of the Libby Dam on the Kootenai River in the late 1960s. The United States Army Corps of Engineers built a new route through the Salish Mountains, including the  Flathead Tunnel, second-longest in the United States, to relocate the tracks away from the Kootenai River. This route opened in 1970. The surviving portions of the older routes (from Columbia Falls to Kalispell and Stryker to Eureka), are now operated by Watco as the Mission Mountain Railroad.

The Great Northern mainline crossed the continental divide through Marias Pass, the lowest crossing of the Rockies south of the Canada–US border. Here, the mainline forms the southern border of Glacier National Park, which the GN promoted heavily as a tourist attraction. GN constructed stations at East Glacier and West Glacier entries to the park, stone and timber lodges at the entries, and other inns and lodges throughout the Park. Many of the structures have been listed on the National Register of Historic Places due to unique construction, location, and the beauty of the surrounding regions.

In 1931, the GN also developed the "Inside Gateway", a route to California that rivaled the Southern Pacific Railroad's route between Oregon and California. The GN route was further inland than the SP route and ran south from the Columbia River in Oregon.  The GN connected with the Western Pacific at Bieber, California; the Western Pacific connected with the Atchison, Topeka, and Santa Fe in Stockton, California, and together the three railroads (GN, WP, and ATSF) competed with Southern Pacific for traffic between California and the Pacific Northwest.  With a terminus at Superior, Wisconsin, the Great Northern was able to provide transportation from the Pacific to the Atlantic by taking advantage of the shorter distance to Duluth from the ocean, as compared to Chicago.

Settlements
The Great Northern energetically promoted settlement along its lines in North Dakota and Montana, especially by Germans and Scandinavians from Europe.  The Great Northern bought its lands from the federal government it received no land grants and resold them to farmers one by one.  It operated agencies in Germany and Scandinavia that promoted its lands, and brought families over at low cost, building special colonist cars to transport immigrant families. The rapidly increasing settlement in North Dakota's Red River Valley along the Minnesota border between 1871 and 1890 was a major example of large-scale "bonanza" farming.

Later history

During World War II, the Army moved its Military Railway Service (MRS) headquarters to Fort Snelling, Minnesota. The MRS worked collaboratively with commercial railroading in the U.S. The Great Northern sponsored the 704th Grand Railroad Division.  It was the second Grand Division that the Army stood up. The Great Northern also sponsored the 732nd Railroad Operating Battalion (ROB). They were one of two spearhead ROBs. The 732nd operated in support of the Patton's 3rd Armored Division crossing into Germany with them. The Officers of the 732nd were all previous employees of the Great Northern.

On March 2, 1970, the Great Northern, together with the Northern Pacific Railway, the Chicago, Burlington and Quincy Railroad and the Spokane, Portland and Seattle Railway, merged to form the Burlington Northern Railroad. The BN operated until 1996 when it merged with the Atchison, Topeka and Santa Fe Railway to form the Burlington Northern and Santa Fe Railway.

Passenger service 

GN operated various passenger trains, but the Empire Builder was their premier passenger train. It was named in honor of James J. Hill, known as the "Empire Builder." Amtrak still operates the Empire Builder today, running it over the old Great Northern's Northern Transcon north of St. Paul.

Named trains
 Alexandrian: St. Paul–Fargo
 Badger Express: St. Paul-Superior/Duluth (later renamed Badger)
 Cascadian: Seattle–Spokane (1909-1959)
 Dakotan: St. Paul-Minot
Eastern Express: Seattle-St. Paul (1903–1906) (replaced by Fast Mail in 1906)
 Empire Builder: Chicago-Seattle/Portland (1929–present)
 Fast Mail No. 27: St. Paul–Seattle (1906–1910) (renamed The Oregonian in 1910)
Glacier Park Limited: St. Paul–Seattle (1915-1929) (replaced by Empire Builder in 1929)
 Gopher: St. Paul-Superior/Duluth
Great Northern Express: (1909–1918) Kansas City-Seattle
 International: Seattle-Vancouver, B.C.
Oregonian : St. Paul–Seattle (1910–1915) (replaced by Glacier Park Limited in 1915)
 Oriental Limited : Chicago-St. Paul-Seattle (replaced by Western Star in 1951)
Puget Sound Express: St. Paul-Seattle (1903–1906) (replaced by Fast Mail in 1906)
 Red River Limited: Grand Forks-St. Paul (later renamed Red River)
 Seattle Express
Southeast Express: (1909–1918) Seattle-Kansas City
 Western Star : Chicago-St. Paul-Seattle-Portland
 Winnipeg Limited: St. Paul-Winnipeg

Rolling stock 
In 1951 the company owned 844 locomotives, including 568 steam, 261 diesel-electric and 15 all-electric, as well 822 passenger-train cars and 43.897 freight-train cars.

Paint Schemes 
The Great Northern had numerous paint scheme variations and color changes over the years, but Rocky the goat was consistently featured.

Preservation

Preserved Steam Locomotives

Preserved Diesel Locomotives 

 EMD SD45 #400 "Hustle Muscle"

Rails to Trails
In addition to the Stone Arch Bridge, parts of the railway have been turned into pedestrian and bicycle trails. In Minnesota, the Cedar Lake Trail is built in areas that were formerly railroad yards for the Great Northern Railway and the Minneapolis and St. Louis Railway. Also in Minnesota, the Dakota Rail Trail is built on 26.5 miles of the railroad right-of-way. In Kalispell Montana there are several sections of rails to trails, one, the farthest west, starts in Kila, MT, and goes to Kalispell Montana. This section of rail way was taken out in the early 1900s. Further west, the Iron Goat Trail in Washington follows the late 19th-century route of the Great Northern Railway through the Cascades and gets its name from the railway's logo. The Spokane and Inland Empire Railroad that James J. Hill purchased in 1929 is now a bicycle path between Spokane, Wa and Coeur d'Alene, Id. and Spokane, Wa. and Pullman, Wa.

In popular culture 

Appearances in popular culture:

 The Great Northern Railway is considered to have inspired (in broad outline, not in specific details) the Taggart Transcontinental railroad in Ayn Rand's Atlas Shrugged.
 The song Great Northern by the Western band Riders In The Sky featured on their 2002 album Ridin' The Tweetsie Railroad describes a journey along the Great Northern Railway.

See also

 Great Northern Roster
 Great Northern Railway: Mansfield Branch (1909-1985)
 W-1 GN's largest electric locomotive
 Spokane and Inland Empire Railroad interurban electric railway purchased by G.N. in 1929.
 Western Fruit Express
 Snow Dozer - A snowplow design unique to the Great Northern.

Footnotes

References

 
 
 
 
 
 Hofsommer, Don L. "Rivals for California: The Great Northern and the Southern Pacific, 1905-1931." Montana: The Magazine of Western History 38.2 (1988): 58–67.

Further reading

 Pyle, Joseph G. "James J. Hill." Minnesota History Bulletin 2#5 1918, pp. 295–323. online

External links

 Lively World of Great Northern (Around 1960)
 Fort Langley
 Great Northern Railway Company Records, Minnesota Historical Society.
 Great Northern Railway Historical Society
 The Great Northern Empire — Then and Now
 The Great Northern Railway
 Great Northern Railway Page
 Great Northern Railway Post Office Car No. 42 — photographs and short history of one of six streamlined baggage-mail cars built for the Great Northern by the American Car and Foundry Company in 1950.
 Great Northern Railway route map (1920) 
 Dutiful Son: Louis W. Hill Sr. Book, Book about Louis W. Hill Sr., son and successor of empire builder James J. Hill at Ramsey County Historical Society.
 "The Egotistigraphy", by John Sanford Barnes. An autobiography, including his role in the early financing of the Great Northern Railway and the career of James J. Hill, privately printed 1910. Internet edition edited by Susan Bainbridge Hay 2012

 
Predecessors of the Burlington Northern Railroad
Companies based in Saint Paul, Minnesota
Defunct Idaho railroads
Defunct Minnesota railroads
Defunct Montana railroads
Defunct North Dakota railroads
Defunct Washington (state) railroads
Defunct Wisconsin railroads
Historic American Engineering Record in Montana
Railway companies established in 1889
Railway companies disestablished in 1970
Defunct California railroads
Defunct South Dakota railroads
Defunct Iowa railroads
Defunct Oregon railroads
American companies established in 1889
1970 disestablishments in Minnesota